Jonathan Campbell (born June 27, 1993) is an American former professional soccer player who played as a defender.

Career
Campbell attended Greensboro Day School where he was the Gatorade State Player of the Year his senior year.

After spending four years at University of North Carolina, Campbell was drafted as the twelfth overall pick in the 2016 MLS SuperDraft by Chicago Fire.

At college, Campbell finished 2015 with NSCAA First Team All-American and First Team All-ACC honors.

He made his professional debut as a half-time substitute in a 3–4 loss against New York City FC on March 6, 2016.

Campbell was released by Chicago at the end of their 2018 season.

On December 28, 2018, Campbell's rights were traded to Seattle Sounders FC in exchange for a fourth-round pick in the 2020 MLS SuperDraft. He was released by Seattle at the end of the 2019 season.
On May 7, 2020 Campbell announced he was retiring from professional soccer.

Honors

Player
Seattle Sounders FC
MLS Cup:  2019

References

External links 

 

1993 births
Living people
American soccer players
North Carolina Tar Heels men's soccer players
North Carolina Fusion U23 players
Seattle Sounders FC U-23 players
Chicago Fire FC draft picks
Chicago Fire FC players
Seattle Sounders FC players
Association football defenders
Soccer players from North Carolina
USL League Two players
Major League Soccer players
Sportspeople from Greensboro, North Carolina
All-American men's college soccer players
Tacoma Defiance players
USL Championship players